The Portal de la 80 is one of the terminus stations of the TransMilenio mass-transit system of Bogotá, Colombia, opened in the year 2000.

Location
The station is located in the north-west of the city, specifically at the intersection of Calle 80 with the future Avenida Longitudinal de Occidente (carrera 96A).

History

On December 17, 2000, Portal de la 80 was opened as the first terminus station on the TransMilenio.

It services the neighborhoods of Álamos Norte, Luis Carlos Galán, and Bochicha. It also serves as a juncture for 10 feeder routes and inter-city connections.

The station is located next to the large shopping center by the same name. Also in the area are a large park and Engativá Hospital.

Station services

Old trunk services

Trunk services

Feeder routes
The station receives the following feeder routes:
 Route 1.1 Álamos Norte loop
 Route 1.2 Garcés Navas loop
 Route 1.3 Villas de Granada loop
 Route 1.4 El Cortijo loop
 Route 1.5 Ciudadela Colsubsidio loop
 Route 1.6 Bolivia Oriental loop
 Route 1.7 Quirigua loop
 Route 1.8 Calle 80
 Route 1.9 Villas del Dorado loop
 Route 1.10 Bolivia / Bochicha II loop

Intercity services
Portal de la 80 is also the juncture point for buses between neighboring municipalities, such as Chía, Mosquera, Madrid, and Facatativá.

See also
 Bogotá
 TransMilenio
 List of TransMilenio Stations

External links
 TransMilenio

TransMilenio